Electoral district of Hornsby is an electoral district of the New South Wales Legislative Assembly in Australia. Hornsby is one of two post-1927 electorates to have never been held by the  party and always by the Liberals, a predecessor party to the Liberals, or an independent, the other such district being Vaucluse. It is represented by Matt Kean of the Liberal Party.

Members for Hornsby

Election results

References

Notes

External links

Hornsby
1927 establishments in Australia
Hornsby
1991 disestablishments in Australia
Constituencies disestablished in 1991
Hornsby
Constituencies established in 1999